Pelagirhabdus fermentum is a bacterium from the genus of Pelagirhabdus which has been isolated from sediments from the Lake Magadi in Kenya.

References

 

Bacillaceae
Bacteria described in 2002